The 2002 Currie Cup was the 2002 season of the South African domestic rugby union competition, the Absa Currie Cup premier division, played from 19 July 2002 - 26 October 2002. The finals were played at Ellis Park Stadium where the Blue Bulls beat the Golden Lions 31–7 to win the Cup. This would be the first win for the Blue Bulls in a streak of 3 consecutive Currie Cup wins from 2002-2004.
South African pay TV channel SuperSport obtained exclusive rights to broadcast the 2002 Currie Cup. The public broadcaster, the South African Broadcasting Corporation could only begin broadcasting the matches 2 hours after SuperSport began their broadcast.

Qualification
The final log of the 2002 Currie Cup qualification series:

The following matches were played in the 2002 Currie Cup qualification series:

Section X

Round one

Round two

Round three

Round four

Round five

Round six

Round seven

Section Y

Round one

Round two

Round three

Round four

Round five

Round six

Round seven

Log

The final log of the 2002 Currie Cup Top 8 series:

Currie Cup Top 8

Round one

Round two

Round three

Round four

Semifinals

Grand final

Final squads

References

 
2002 in South African rugby union
2002 rugby union tournaments for clubs